Puerto Rico Highway 462 (PR-462) is an east–west road between the municipalities of Aguadilla and Moca in Puerto Rico.

Major intersections

See also

 List of highways numbered 462

References

External links
 

462